Onychocamptus is a genus of copepods belonging to the family Laophontidae.

The species of this genus are found in Europe, Australia and Northern America.

Species:
 Onychocamptus anomalus (Ranga Reddy, 1984) 
 Onychocamptus bengalensis (Sewell, 1934)

References

Harpacticoida
Copepod genera